Dark Rain Shorts are a series of Maldivian suspense thriller films produced by Dark Rain Entertainment. They released their first short film titled Dhauvathu on 1 October 2020. The project developed to encourage and support the hard working artists of Maldives during economically uncertain times with regard to COVID-19 pandemic.

List of productions

Premises

Dhauvathu
Jina (Mohamed Hoodh) meets a stranger, Zoona (Mariyam Shifa) at the bus stop who invites him to her house. There he is introduced to Zoona's husband, Sunie (Ahmed Sunie) who reveals that Zoona died two years ago. Things take an unexpected turn when his prank goes wrong in the most horrified way.

Anguru
Aminath (Aminath Silna), a victim of a sexual assault becomes mentally disturbed. Her father, Manik (Roanu Hassan Manik) desperately seeks assistance from the authorities to identify the rapist but sees no hope. One day, Aminath recognizes him on the street. In the process of self-administered justice and revenge, Manik makes a grave mistake which he never saw coming.

Cast and characters
Dhauvathu
 Ahmed Sunie as Sunie
 Mariyam Shifa as Zoona / Shifu
 Hoodh Ibrahim as Jina

Anguru
 Roanu Hassan Manik as Manik
 Aminath Silna as Aminath
 Fathimath Zuhair
 Ahmed Faiz
 Ibrahim Shiyaz
 Mohamed Mahil
 Afsar Mridha

Reception
The first release from the Dark Rain Short was well received by the critics and noted the sharp and intrigued writing for bringing the required twists and thrills.

References

Short film series
Maldivian web series
2020 web series debuts